Hunk may refer to:

Arts and entertainment
 Hunk (film), a 1987 comedy movie starring John Allen Nelson, Steve Levitt, James Coco, and Avery Schreiber
 The Hunks a reality television series
 Hunk, a movie character, the Scarecrow's Kansas counterpart in the 1939 film The Wizard of Oz
 HUNK (Resident Evil), a character in the Resident Evil video game series
 Hunk (Voltron), a character in the Voltron franchise
 Hunking "Hunk" Marriner, a character in the 1937 novel Northwest Passage, a 1940 film and a 1958-59 TV series

Other uses
 Hunk (nickname)
 Amiga Hunk, a codename for AmigaOS executable files
 Hero Honda Hunk, a 150 cc motorcycle launched by Hero Honda Motors India Ltd
 The changed parts in a diff of files
 Beefcake, a sexually attractive or well-muscled man

See also

 
 
 Hunkar (disambiguation)
 Hunker (disambiguation)
 Hunky (disambiguation)